Big Shrimpin' is an American reality television series that premiered on November 17, 2011 on the History channel. The series follows three longtime shrimpers from Bayou La Batre, Alabama who are employed for Dominick Ficarino, who owns Dominick's Seafood. They battle each other, other companies, and harsh conditions as they shrimp for several months nonstop in the waters of Texas, Alabama, and Louisiana.

Cast

Dominick's Seafood
Dominick Ficarino - He presides over the entire enterprise and is a lifelong Bayou La Batre resident and fourth-generation shrimper who owns Dominick’s Seafood, the most successful business in town. He’s a boss with an iron fist in a velvet glove, and his crews are loyal to a fault.

Miss Hannah Crew
Captain: Charles ("Redbone") - He is the commander of the Miss Hannah and is a fourth-generation shrimper. He claims that he has 5 decades of experience because his mother gave birth to him on a shrimping boat 50 years ago. His personality can stir up trouble with his crew though in the tight quarters of the boat.
Deckhand: Charles Jr. ("Red")
Deckhand: Chad ("Pecker Head")
Deckhand: BJ

Miss Barbara Crew
Captain: Jeremy Schjott ("Bullfrog") - He is the ruler of the roost of the Miss Barbara. He is 32 and is Dominick's youngest captain. He used to be a deckhand and has now commanded his own ship for 8 years. He is a practical joker and is dead serious about his job.
Deckhand: Larry Godsey ("Dog")
Deckhand: Michael Shawn Robbins
Deckhand: Mikey Mo Robbins

Miss Ashleigh Crew
Captain: Roy Wilkerson ("Roundhead") - He considers himself as one of the best shrimpers in the business. He has had bad luck come his way the past few years. His son Jonathan works on the boat with him and they have a testy relationship.
Deckhand: Jonathan Wilkerson ("Little Roundhead")
Deckhand: Joe Covas
Deckhand: Bryant St. Amant ("Little Fella")
Deckhand: Bobby Ray

Episodes

See also
 Deadliest Catch a similar series on the Discovery Channel
 Lobster Wars a similar series on the Discovery Channel

References

External links
  of Big Shrimpin'
 

2010s American reality television series
2011 American television series debuts
Fishing television series
History (American TV channel) original programming
Television shows set in Alabama
2012 American television series endings